Apostasia may refer to:
 Apostasia of 1965, a series of political events in Greece, which toppled the legally elected government of George Papandreou, senior
 Apostasia (plant), a genus of primitive orchids (family Orchidaceae), comprising 7 terrestrial species

See also
 Apostasy, abandonment of one's religion